Crescent Lake or Lake Crescent may refer to:

United States
Alphabetical by state
Lakes:
Crescent Lake (Alaska)
Crescent Lake (Arizona)
Crescent Lake (Florida), in Putnam and Flagler counties
Crescent Lake (Pensacola), Florida
Crescent Lake (Rattlesnake Pond), Maine
Crescent Lake (Waterford Township, Michigan)
Crescent Lake (Minnesota)
Crescent Lake, in Park County, Montana
Crescent Lake, in Wolfeboro, New Hampshire
Crescent Lake (Oregon)
Crescent Lake (Utah)
Lake Crescent, Washington

Settlements:
 Crescent Lake, Oregon, a census-designated place

Worldwide
Alphabetical by country
Lake Crescent (Tasmania), Australia
Crescent Lake, near Roberts Arm, Newfoundland and Labrador, Canada
Crescent Lake (Dunhuang), in Dunhuang, Gansu, China
Yueya Lake (Nanjing) (Crescent Moon Lake), Nanjing, Jiangsu, China